The Working for America Institute (WAI) is a non-profit organization that is an allied organization of the AFL–CIO. It promotes economic development, develops new economic policies, and lobbies the United States Congress on economic policy.

It was established in 1958 as the Human Resources Development Institute (HRDI) of the AFL–CIO. The AFL–CIO changed its name, structure and goals in 1998 as part of a large AFL–CIO restructuring.

WAI receives financial support from the federal government, private foundations and the AFL–CIO.

References
 Gilroy, Tom. "Labor to Stress Get-Out-the-Vote Among Members in Fall Elections." Labor Relations Week. October 21, 1998.

External links
 Working for America Institute

AFL–CIO
1958 establishments in the United States
Trade unions in the United States

Trade unions established in 1958